The Rivière du Milieu is a tributary of the Launière River, flowing in the unorganized territory of Lac-Jacques-Cartier, in the La Côte-de-Beaupré Regional County Municipality, in the administrative region of Capitale-Nationale, in the province of Quebec, at Canada.

This watercourse is located in the center of the Laurentides Wildlife Reserve. This valley is indirectly accessible by the route 175 (route Antonio-Talbot). Secondary forest roads serve the sector for forestry and recreational tourism activities, in particular the forest road R0320 which runs on the north side of lakes Maigre and Valois and crosses the Middle River upstream of Lake Maigre.

Forestry is the main economic activity in the sector; recreational tourism, second.

The surface of the Middle River (except the rapids areas) is usually frozen from the end of November to the beginning of April, however the safe circulation on the ice is generally done from mid-December to the end of March.

Geography 
The main watersheds neighboring the Rivière du Milieu are:
 north side: Launière River, Honorine Lake;
 east side: Jacques-Cartier River, Jacques-Cartier Lake;
 south side: Jacques-Cartier River, Launière River, Rocheuse River;
 west side: Launière River, Champlain lake, Cavée River.

The "rivière du Milieu" has its source at the mouth of Warbonne Lake. This lake has two outlets:
 South side: after a channel of a hundred meters, the current flows into a small lake where a dam has been built at its mouth. After this dam, the current continues on  first towards the south, then branches off towards the west to join the main course of the Rivière du Milieu;

Its course is described according to the following segments:

  south to the outlet (coming from the west) Lac Kay;
  towards the south-east by collecting the outlet (coming from the southwest) from Cayer lake, up to the outlet (coming from the north) from lakes Beauséjour, Sirois and Petit lac Sirois;
  to the south in a deep valley forming some serpentines, crossing on  the western end of Lac Maigre up to the dam built at its mouth;
  to the south by collecting the discharge (coming from the west) from Loyer and Bout lakes, then forming a loop towards the east, up to a bend in the river, corresponding at the outlet of a stream (coming from the south-west);
  south-east, to the outlet (coming from the east) of Lac Roy and Lac Reg;
  to the south-west in a deep valley at the end of the segment, to its mouth.

The current of the Rivière du Milieu flows into a river T on the east bank of the Launière River. From there, the current over  towards the south-east in a deep valley and forming a small curve towards the north-east to go around a mountain, until its mouth.

Toponym 
The toponym "Rivière du Milieu" was formalized on June 6, 1973, at the Place Names Bank of the Commission de toponymie du Québec.

See also 

 List of rivers of Quebec

References

External links 
 Official site of the Laurentides Wildlife Reserve

Rivers of Capitale-Nationale
La Côte-de-Beaupré Regional County Municipality
Laurentides Wildlife Reserve